Winston Churchill: His Times, His Crimes is a 2022 book by British-Pakistani writer, journalist, political activist and historian Tariq Ali. In it, Ali discusses Winston Churchill's racial and imperialist views.

Synopsis
The book is described as "A coruscating portrait of Britain’s greatest imperialist."

Reception
Historian Andrew Roberts was highly critical of the book, stating that the book "makes so many basic factual errors that Churchill’s reputation emerges unscathed from this onslaught", and that the "quality of Ali’s research is so execrable that he even cites the fictional TV series Peaky Blinders as a source".

Writing for Prospect Priyamvada Gopal welcomed the book; noting that it "draws on more honest existing historical scholarship than most popular biographies of Churchill" and portrays Churchill as "profoundly authoritarian, with a soft spot for fascist strongmen, and a hostility to working-class assertion."

In The Daily Telegraph Simon Heffer acknowledges that Churchill "was a racist" but argues Ali fails to consider the "historical context." Heffer also argues that "Ali seems to mount a class analysis of Churchill's wickedness, but he never really succeeds."

References

2022 non-fiction books
Biographies of Winston Churchill
Books about politics of the United Kingdom
Books about imperialism
Books by Tariq Ali
History books about the British Empire
History books about the United Kingdom
Verso Books books